Stafford is the county town of Staffordshire, England.

Stafford may also refer to:

Places

Other places in England
 Stafford, Dolton, Devon
 Stafford (UK Parliament constituency)
 Stafford Castle
 Stafford, Staffordshire
 Borough of Stafford, a district of Staffordshire
 County of Stafford, another name for Staffordshire
 West Stafford, in Dorset

United States
 Stafford, California (disambiguation)
Stafford, Humboldt County, California
Stafford, Sutter County, California, historic name of a hamlet now superseded by Live Oak, Sutter County, California
 Stafford, Connecticut
 Stafford, Kansas
 Stafford, Nebraska
 Stafford Township, New Jersey
 Stafford, New York
 Stafford, Ohio
 Stafford, Oregon
 Stafford, Texas
 Stafford, Virginia
 Stafford County, Virginia

Australia
 Stafford, Queensland, a suburb of Brisbane
 Electoral district of Stafford, Queensland, Australia

South Africa
 Stafford, Gauteng, a suburb of Johannesburg

People

Surname
 Stafford (surname)

Given name
Anthony Stafford Beer (1926-2002), British theorist, consultant and professor at the Manchester Business School
Stafford Cripps (1889–1952), British politician
Stafford Huyler, cartoonist who created the webcomic NetBoy
Stafford Repp (1918–1974), American character actor
Stafford Fairborne (1666–1742), British politician
John Stafford Smith (1750–1836), British composer, church organist, and musicologist

Other
The Stafford London is a boutique hotel in St. James's, London, England
Stafford Disaster Relief and Emergency Assistance Act
Stafford Farm, a farm in Voorhees, New Jersey
Stafford Loan, a type of loan offered to American students demonstrating financial need
Stafford Plantation, Cumberland Island, Georgia, United States
Stafford, a character from Thomas & Friends
Stafford, a clothing line from J. C. Penney
Stafford, short for Staffordshire Bull Terrier
Stafford Gambit in chess
1990 Stafford rail crash, England (inattentive driver)
1996 Stafford rail crash at Rickerscote, England (axle failure)

See also

 
 
Staffort, in Germany
Strafford (disambiguation)
Stratford (disambiguation)
Justice Stafford (disambiguation)